Shake is the first solo album released by John Schlitt, lead singer of the Christian rock band Petra. It was released in the Spring of 1995.

Track listing
 "Wake the Dead" – 5:32 (words & music by Schlitt, Mark Heimermann and Dann Huff)
 "Don't Look Back" – 3:47 (words & music by Schlitt and Jim Cooper)
 "Show Me the Way" – 4:18 (words & music by Schlitt and Tommy Greer)
 "Inside of You" – 4:44 (words & music by Billy Sprague, Heimermann, Dann Huff and Schlitt)
 "Let It Show" – 4:32 (words & music by Schlitt, Heimermann and Dann Huff)
 "Carry the Burden" – 4:19 (words & music by Schlitt, Dann & David Huff)
 "One by One" – 4:01 (words & music by Joe Fair, Schlitt and Rich Gootee)
 "Try Understanding His Heart" – 3:55 (words & music by Schlitt, Cooper and Ronny Cates)
 "The Hard Way" – 3:32 (words & music by Tom Wanca and Mark H. Chesshir)
 "The Road to Calvary" – 4:50 (words & music by Gootee, Schlitt and Cooper)

Personnel 

 John Schlitt – lead vocals, backing vocals (1–6, 9), harmony vocals (1, 2, 6)
 Mark Heimermann – keyboards (1, 3, 4, 5), backing vocals (1–6), drums (5), percussion (5)
 Blair Masters – additional keyboards (2, 6), additional programming (7, 8), keyboards (10)
 Jim Cooper – programming (7, 8), arrangements (7, 8)
 Dann Huff – guitars, bass (1, 2, 5, 6, 9), drums (1, 3, 5), percussion (1, 3, 5), keyboards (2, 4, 6, 9), arrangements (10)
 Joe Spivey – mandolin (10), violin (10)
 Jackie Street – bass (3, 4, 10)
 David Huff – drums (1–4, 6–10), percussion (1–4, 6–9), backing vocals (2, 6), shaker (10)
 Robert White Johnson – backing vocals (2, 6, 9)
 Kim Fleming – backing vocals (7, 8, 10)
 Vicki Hampton – backing vocals (7, 8, 10)
 Donna McElroy – backing vocals (7, 8, 10)
 Kari Schlitt – backing vocals (7)
 Micah Wilshire – backing vocals (9)
 Chris Rodriguez – backing vocals (10)
 Duawne Starling – backing vocals (10)
 Brandon Harris – children's vocals on "Wake the Dead"
 Taylor Harris – children's vocals on "Wake the Dead"
 Perry Heimermann – children's vocals on "Wake the Dead"
 Peyton Heimermann – children's vocals on "Wake the Dead"
 Jerry Wise – children's vocals on "Wake the Dead"
 Joy Wise – children's Vocals on "Wake the Dead"

Production

 Mark Heimermann – producer for Fun Attic Productions (1, 3–5)
 Dann Huff – producer (1–6, 9), engineer (2, 6, 9) at Dobb's Palace, Ashlyne Studio, Franklin, Tennessee,  Fun Attic Studio, Franklin, Tennessee
 David Huff – producer (2, 6, 9), engineer (2, 6, 9)
 Greg Nelson – producer (7, 8, 10) at The Bennett House, Franklin, Tennessee, The Sound Kitchen, Franklin, Tennessee, Quad Studios Nashville, Tennessee, The Dugout, Nashville, Tennessee, Greg Nelson Studio Nashville, Tennessee
 JB – engineer at Ashlyne Studio, Franklin (1, 3–5)
 Joe Baldridge – engineer (1, 3–5)
 Penn Singleton – engineer (1, 3–5)
 Shane D. Wilson – engineer (1, 3–5)
 Jeff Balding – engineer (7, 8, 10)
 Steve Bishir – engineer (7, 8, 10)
 Keith Compton – engineer (7, 8, 10)
 Greg Parker – engineer (7, 8, 10), assistant engineer (7, 8, 10)
 Bill Deaton – engineer  (7, 8, 10), mixing at Battery Studio, Nashville, Tennessee (1, 3–5, 7, 8, 10)
 Chris DavieMartin Woodlee – assistant engineer (7, 8, 10)
 Kevin HippMartin Woodlee – assistant engineer (7, 8, 10)
 McLeanMartin Woodlee – assistant engineer (7, 8, 10)
 Greg ParkerMartin Woodlee – assistant engineer (7, 8, 10)
 Martin Woodlee – assistant engineer (7, 8, 10)
 Ronnie Brookshire – mixing at Emerald Studios, Nashville, Tennessee (2, 6, 9)
 Carry Summers – mix assistant (1, 3–5, 7, 8, 10)
 Timothy Waters – mix assistant (2, 6, 9)
 Pete Martinez – mix assistant (7, 8, 10)
 Marty William – editing (1, 3–5)
 Paul James Heimermann – production manager (1, 3–5)
 Bubba Smith – executive producer
 Hank Williams – mastering at MasterMix, Nashville, Tennessee
 Diana Barnes –art direction
 Frank Chi – design 
 Gabrielle Raumberger Design – design 
 Ron Keith – photography

References

1995 debut albums
John Schlitt albums
Albums produced by Dann Huff
Albums produced by David Huff (drummer)